This is a List of FIA Formula Two Championship drivers, that is, a list of drivers who have made at least one race start in the FIA Formula Two Championship (2009–2012). This list is accurate up to the end of the 2012 season.

By name

By nationality

References

External links
 Official Website of the FIA Formula Two Championship

 
FIA Formula Two Championship drivers